An area yield options contract is a contract entitling the holder to receive a payment when the area yield is below the put or above the call option strike yield.  The strike yield is the yield at which the holder of an option contract can exercise the option.

See also

 Binary option
 Bond option
 CBOE S&P 500 PutWrite Index
 Covered call
 Credit default option
 Exotic interest rate option
 Foreign exchange option
 Interest rate cap and floor
 Married put
 Moneyness
 Naked call
 Naked put
 Option time value
 Options on futures
 Pre-emption right
 Put–call parity
 Real option
 Right of first refusal
 Stock option
 Swaption

References

Contract law
Derivatives (finance)
Options (finance)
Fixed income analysis